Walls is the thirty-sixth studio album by American singer and songwriter Barbra Streisand, released on November 2, 2018, by Columbia Records. The lead single "Don't Lie to Me" was written as a criticism of America's political climate amid the presidency of Donald Trump, while the title track alludes to Trump's frequent calls for a wall at the Mexico border. The album debuted at number 12 on the US Billboard 200, but it dropped off after a second week on the chart. As of January 2023, the album has become Streisand's fifth studio album not to be certified Gold or Platinum by RIAA.

Critical reception
{{Album ratings
| MC = 84/100
| rev1 = AllMusic
| rev1Score = <ref name="allmusicreview">{{cite web|url=https://www.allmusic.com/album/walls-mw0003213404|title=Walls - Barbra Streisand : Songs, Reviews, Credits, Awards|publisher=AllMusic|access-date=2 November 2018}}</ref>
| rev2 = The Guardian| rev2Score = 
| rev3 = The Independent| rev3Score = 
| rev4 = The Times| rev4Score = 
}}Walls received acclaim from music critics. At Metacritic, which assigns a normalized rating out of 100 to reviews from mainstream critics, Walls has an average score of 84 based on 5 reviews.Walls was nominated for Best Traditional Pop Vocal Album at the 62nd Annual Grammy Awards.Year-end listsCommercial performanceWalls debuted at number 12 on the US Billboard 200 but then dropped off the charts after a second week. Walls opened at number six on the UK Albums Chart, selling 15,604 copies and giving Streisand her 36th top-75 album and 15th top-10 entry in the United Kingdom. In Australia Walls debuted at number seven on the ARIA Albums Chart.

Track listing
Adapted from Playbill''.

Personnel
Adapted from AllMusic.

Walter Afanasieff – arranger, keyboards, orchestral arrangements, producer, synthesizer  
Tariqh Akoni – acoustic guitar 
Leo Amuedo – acoustic guitar  
Annie Bosko – background vocals 
Adrian Bradford – engineer 
Jorge Calandrelli – orchestral arrangements 
David Campbell – string arrangements 
Mabvuto Carpenter – background vocals 
Desmond Child – keyboards, producer, programming 
Steve Churchyard – orchestration recording  
Tim Davis – choir director  
Nathan East – bass guitar
Kenneth Edmonds – vocals
David Foster – arranger, producer 
Ian Fraser – arranger 
Dmytro Gordon – engineer 
Tyler Gordon – engineer 
Mark Graham – music preparation 
Keith Gretlein – engineer, programming 
Missi Hale – background vocals 
Jeri Heiden – design 
Russell James – photography 
Jay Landers – executive producer, liner notes  
Whitney Martin – music contractor 
Michael McDonald – vocals 
Vlado Meller – mastering 
Shawn Murphy – orchestration recording 
Jonas Myrin – arranger, associate producer, background vocals 
Obie O'Brien – orchestration recording
J.C. Monterrosa – orchestration recording  
Clay Perry – arranger, keyboards, programming 
Tim Pierce – electric guitar 
Tiffany Plamer – background vocals 
William Ross – adaptation, arranger, orchestral arrangements 
John Shanks – bass, guitar, keyboards, producer, programming, background vocals 
Blake Slatkin – keyboards, programming 
Barbra Streisand – arranger, art direction, executive producer, primary artist, producer 
Shari Sutcliffe – music contractor 
Mary Webster – score coordinator 
Kris Wilkinson – music contractor 
Lucy Woodward – background vocals 
Gina Zimmitti – music contractor

Charts

Certifications

References

External links
Barbra Archives: Walls (2018)

2018 albums
Barbra Streisand albums
Political music albums by American artists
Columbia Records albums
Albums produced by Walter Afanasieff
Albums produced by Desmond Child
Albums produced by David Foster
Albums produced by John Shanks